Tatjana Lojanica (born 19 January 1981) is a Serbian sprinter. She competed in the women's 4 × 400 metres relay at the 2000 Summer Olympics, representing Yugoslavia.

References

1981 births
Living people
Athletes (track and field) at the 2000 Summer Olympics
Serbian female sprinters
Yugoslav female sprinters
Olympic athletes of Yugoslavia
Place of birth missing (living people)
Olympic female sprinters